Monique Esther Nemni (March 27, 1936 – 2 November 2022) was an Egyptian-born Canadian linguist and writer, best known for a series of biographies of former Prime Minister of Canada Pierre Trudeau which she cowrote with her husband Max Nemni.

Nemni was a professor of linguistics at the Université du Québec à Montréal, and a coeditor of Cité Libre.

The first volume of the Trudeau biography, Young Trudeau: Son of Quebec, Father of Canada, 1919-1944, won the Shaughnessy Cohen Prize for Political Writing in 2006. The second volume, Trudeau Transformed: The Shaping of a Statesman, 1944-1965, was a shortlisted nominee for the same award in 2011. A third volume, focusing on Trudeau's career in elected politics after 1965, is slated for future publication.

Nemni died of a heart attack in Naples, on 2 November 2022, at the age of 86.

Works

Young Trudeau: Son of Quebec, Father of Canada, 1919-1944 (2006)
Trudeau Transformed: The Shaping of a Statesman, 1944-1965 (2011)

References

1936 births
2022 deaths
Linguists from Canada
Linguists from Italy
Canadian magazine editors
Canadian biographers
Canadian non-fiction writers in French
Canadian women non-fiction writers
Writers from Montreal
Women linguists
Academic staff of the Université du Québec à Montréal
Women magazine editors
Women biographers
Italian emigrants to Canada
20th-century linguists
21st-century linguists